Vainola is a surname. Notable people with the surname include:

Allan Vainola (born 1965), an Estonian singer, guitarist, and composer
Ville Vainola (born 1996), Finnish ice hockey defenceman

Surnames
Estonian-language surnames
Finnish-language surnames